Subhasish Mukherjee is an Indian Bengali actor. He is a well-known actor in Bengali cinema. He generally appears in comedy and in supporting roles. However, he has proven his versatility as an actor in films like Herbert and Mahalaya. Some of his well-known films where he acted are Guru Shishya, Shatrur Mokabila, Surya, Coolie, Greptar, Besh Korechi Prem Korechi.

Career
He made his debut in 1987 through Purnendu Patri's film Choto Bakulpurer Jatri. In the following years, he became a regular actor in Tollywood. His performance in the Bengali film Herbert was well received by the audience and media, globally.  Mukherjee served as the lead actor in the 2011 Bengali fictional movie, Tenida (film). Some of his other notable works are in the movies Teen Kanya and Meghe Dhaka Tara. He has acted in several telefilms. In 2019, he acted in film named Mahalaya and Sandip Ray's Professor Shonku O El Dorado. He is known for comedic roles in movies like Sasur Bari Zindabad, Streer Maryada, Protisodh, Praner Cheye Priyo, Surya, Akrosh, Dada Thakur, Sakal Sandhya, Besh Korechi Prem Korechi, Mon Mane Na, Saat Pake Bandha, Madhu Malati

Filmography
 Oti Uttam (2022)
 Habu Chandra Raja Gobu Chandra Montri  (2021)
 Sohorer Upokotha (2021)
 Cholo Potol Tuli (2020)
 Brahma Janen Gopon Kommoti
 Paran Bandhu Re (2019)
 Professor Shonku O El Dorado (as Nakur Babu) (2019)
 Hullor
 Mahalaya (as Birendra Krishna Bhadra) (2019)
 Signature (2018), short film by kolkotha production.
 Sultan: The Saviour (2018) as Disha's father
 Prem Ki Bujhini (2016) as Principal
 Hera Pheri (2016)
 Besh Korechi Prem Korechi (2015) as Tab Shastri
 Arshinagar (2015) as Purohit
 Pendulum (2014)
 Gogoler Kirti (2014)
 Nirbhoya (2013)
 Mrs. Sen (2013)
 Teen Kanya (2012)
 Meghe Dhaka Tara (2013)
 Bangal Ghoti Phataphati (2012)
 Baghini Kanya (2012)
 Awara (2012)
 Haatchhani (2012)
 Chalo Patol Tuli (2011)
 Khokababu (2011)
 Faande Poriya Boga Kaande Re (2011)
 Mon Bole Priya Priya (2011)
 Tenida (film) (2011)
 Gorosthaney Sabdhan (Feluda movie, 2010) as William Girindranath Biswas
 Mon Chay Tomay (2010)
 Pratidwandi (2010)
 Export (2010)
 Hangover (2010)
 Mon Mane Na (2008)
 Bhalobasa Bhalobasa (2008)
 Greptar (2007) as Hitler
 Sangharsha (2007)
 I Love you(2007)
 Eri Naam Prem (2006)
 Nayak The Real Hero (2006)
 Herbert (2006)
 Shubhodrishti (as Nitai Pondit)(2005)
 Bazi (2005)
 Chore Chore Mastuto Bhai (2005)
 Shakal Sandhya (2005)
 Amu (2005)
 Rajmohol (2005)
 Pratisodh (2004)
 Barood (2004)
 Coolie (2004)
 Surya (2004) as Shambhu
 Premi (2004)
 Sajani (2004)
 Tyaag (2004) 
 Badsha The King (2004)
 Kalo Chita (2004)
 Aakrosh (2004)
 Champion (2003) as Kanu
 Mayer Anchal (2003)
 Rakhe Hari Mare Ke (2003)
 Sabuj Saathi (2003)
 Shatrur Mokabila (2002)
 Kurukshetra (2002)
 Dada Thakur (2001)
 Guru Shisya (2001)
 Har Jeet (2000) as Bhola
 Sasurbari Zindabad (2000)
 Bakul Priya (1997)
 Bhoy (film) (1996)
 Ujaan (1995)
 Sansar Sangram (1995)
 Kaalpurush (1994)
 Anubhav (1993)
 Koto Bhalobasha(1992)
 Surer Bhubane (1992)
 Choto Bakulpurer Jatri (1987) - debut film

Web series
 Tansener Tanpura

Television appearances
 Byomkesh as Boroda (episodic appearance)
 Detective (Zee Bangla TV series) as Jal Mohan Ganguly
 Taranath Tantrik on  Colors Bangla as Kapalik
 Rakhi Bandhan (Star Jalsha) as Amaresh Chatterjee
 Koler Bou (Star Jalsha) as Nakuleshwar Ghatak
 Jarowar Jhumko (Zee Bangla) as Ajit Karmakar, Jarowar and Jhumko's father 
  khelaghor (Star Jalsha) as Sarbojit Roy, Ranjit, Ajit and Shantu's father

References

External links

Bengali male actors
Living people
Scottish Church Collegiate School alumni
Seth Anandram Jaipuria College alumni
University of Calcutta alumni
Indian male television actors
Indian male film actors
Male actors from Kolkata
Male actors in Bengali cinema
Bengali male television actors
20th-century Indian male actors
21st-century Indian male actors
Year of birth missing (living people)